The Coat of arms of Izium is a symbol of Izium and Iziumsky raion since September 25, 2001. The first project of the coat of arms was suggested in 1863 which had the following description: "There are three green bunches of grapes on the surface of the golden schield: two of them are at the top and one is at the bottom. The schield is decorated with the silver three-torrented crown and encircled with golden wheat stalks linked with Alexander's banner". The project of 1863 was not approved then but in  2001 the City Hall took the project as a base for the current coat of arms.

Kharkiv Oblast